Deori, Sagar is a historical city situated on the banks of river " Aas " Sukhchain, on the Narsinghpur-Sagar city road. Deori kalan is a 150 year old municipality under Sagar district in the state of Madhya Pradesh, India.

Geography
It has an average elevation of 360 metres (1181 feet).

Demographics
 India census, Deori had a population of 23,812. Males constitute 52% of the population and females 48%. Deori has an average literacy rate of 70%, higher than the national average of 59.5%: male literacy is 77% and, female literacy is 63%. In Deori, 15% of the population is under 6 years of age.

History

Deori is a historical city of Sagar District in the state of Madhya Pradesh, India. It has the position of Tehsil.
The population of Deori is 50,000 (approx.).

In the 17th century, King GOND founded this city. Earlier it was known as Ramgarh or Ujargarh. Later on a temple was constructed at this place, after which the city was renamed as ‘Deori’, meaning the ‘Abode of God’.

It is famous as "Panch Mahlon Ki Rajdhani" in the historical area.
A Fort of ancient rule time is situated at the center of city.
The oldest temple is in the city. The historical items are constructed at the surrounding area of this temple.

The Deori city had a unique role during the independence movement and once visited by Mahatma Gandhi.
The "Nauradehi" sanctuary is near the Deori. Its total area is 103.62 square kilo meter (Approx). Sambhar, Cheetal, Krishnamriga and Neelgay are found in this sanntury. The Gopalpura forest is very near from Deori. The Gopalpura is known by the name of 'Sagon' (Teak) and 'Tendu' Forest.

Civic Administration
Deori is represented in the Madhya Pradesh Legislative Assembly by the  Deori (Vidhan Sabha constituency). As of 2018, its representative in the State Assembly is Harsh Yadav of the Indian National Congress.

Temples
Deori city has many New and old historic Temples. The famous temples are Khanderao,
phota mindir Lord Shiv Temple Near of Nirala cloth making shop NOTA Rode and behind block colony nearest
sankatmochan hanuman mandir (old about 100 years)Mahakali Math, Marai Mata mandir, dakshin mukhi hanuman mandir near kachehari, Kherapati Mandir Baderiya Tiraha, Sai mandir.
The Jain temples of Bina Barha is an Atishay Jain tirth, situated in the rural area of Garhpipariya of Deori.Acharya Vidyasagar has visited this temple many times for chaturmas. Acharya Vidyasagar has been a source of inspiration for all residents of Deori, during religious functions organized in Deori.

College
The non-government college is established by Shri Dwarka Prasad Katare in 1964 in the area of higher education. After this, the college became undertaken of the government on 1-8-1973. The Swami Vivekanand College has been merged in this college on 1-9-1975.

At present, the college is situated at the by-pass road near new police station. The construction of college building is done with the help of Govt. and University Grants Commission. The college became transferred in new building in March 1989. The college has . (approx.) land of itself.
College Building, Playground and Garden are constructed in this land. The college has got the position of Post Graduate College in the session 1996–97. The Library is constructed at the first floor of the college building.

References

External links
 http://www.mp.gov.in/

Sagar, Madhya Pradesh
Cities and towns in Sagar district